AEP may refer to:

Companies and organizations
 Association of Educational Psychologists, British trade union
 American Electric Power, an electric utility company
 Association of Electricity Producers, a trade association for the UK electricity market
 Association of Environmental Professionals, a non-profit organization
 Alpha Epsilon Pi, an international Jewish college fraternity
 Australian Equality Party
 Associação dos Escoteiros de Portugal (Scout Association of Portugal), interreligious and coed Scouting organization

Software
 AppleTalk Echo Protocol, a protocol designed to test the reachability of network nodes
 .aep, Adobe After Effects project file extension
 Android Extension Pack, a superset of OpenGL ES 3.1 introduced by Google in 2014

Sports
 AEP Olympias BC, alternate name for Olympiada Patras BC, a Greek professional basketball club
 AEP Paphos FC, a Cypriot soccer club
 Asociacion Española de Pickleball (Spanish Pickleball Association), the national governing body of pickleball in Spain

Other uses
 Aeroparque Jorge Newbery (Jorge Newbery Airfield), an international airport in Buenos Aires, Argentina (IATA code AEP)
 Aminoethylpiperazine, an organic compound
 Asymptotic equipartition property, a mathematical property used extensively in information theory
 Attenuated Energy Projectile
 The Algebraic Eigenvalue Problem, a mathematical book by James H. Wilkinson, published in 1965
 asparagine endopeptidase, an enzyme
 auditory evoked potential

See also 
 AEP Building, Columbus, Ohio
 AEP v. Connecticut, a 2011 United States Supreme Court case
 Arctic Environmental Protection Strategy (AEPS)